The Goroi class (ゴロイ) was a class of steam tank locomotives of the Chosen Government Railway (Sentetsu) with 2-4-2 wheel arrangement. The "Goro" name came from the American naming system for steam locomotives, under which locomotives with 2-4-2 wheel arrangement were called "Columbia".

Description
Three Goro-class locomotives were built in 1923 by Kisha Seizō of Japan for Sentetsu, delivered in 1924. Initially numbered 61-63, they received the ゴロイ1 through ゴロイ3 numbers in Sentetsu's general renumbering of 1938.

After the partition of Korea, all three Goroi-class locomotives went to the Korean State Railway in North Korea, where they were designated 고로하 (Koroha) class and numbered 고로하1 through 고로하3.

Construction

References

Locomotives of Korea
Locomotives of North Korea
Railway locomotives introduced in 1924
2-4-2T locomotives
Kisha Seizo locomotives